Leondios G. Kostrikis is a biochemist from Cyprus and a Professor of Biological Sciences at the University of Cyprus.

Education

Kostrikis received his scientific education in biochemistry from New York University. In 1987, he received his B.Sc. degree, supported by a Fulbright Scholarship. In 1993, he received his Ph.D.

Career

He then moved to Aaron Diamond AIDS Research Center (ADARC) to do HIV research. In 1999, he was appointed Assistant Professor of Rockefeller University. In 2003, he returned to Cyprus. He became Head of Laboratory of Biotechnology and Molecular Virology and Professor of Biological Sciences at the University of Cyprus.

Deltacron

In January 2022, Kostrikis announced that his research group at the University of Cyprus in Nicosia found a new variant of SARS-CoV-2, which purportedly shares specific properties with the variants Delta and Omicron. The group dubbed the supposed new variant "Deltacron". Maria Van Kerkhove, Richard Neher (head of Max Planck Institute for Developmental Biology and associate professor of University of Basel) and other scientists challenged this announcement, saying a lab mistake is a more probable explanation for the Cyprus lab's finding.

The "Deltacron" phenomenon reported by Kostrikis is not related to a "Deltacron" variant reported by the World Health Organization on March 9, 2022.

References

External links
 Google Scholar: Leondios Kostrikis

Living people
New York University alumni
Date of birth missing (living people)
Academic staff of the University of Cyprus
Cypriot scientists
Biochemists
Year of birth missing (living people)